Jared Smith (born March 20, 1990) is a former American football guard. He played college football at New Hampshire. He was invited to the 2013 NFL Combine as a defensive lineman. He was drafted by Seattle Seahawks in the seventh round of the 2013 NFL Draft. Before the 2013 season, he was transitioned from a defensive lineman to an offensive lineman.

College career
Smith played college football for the New Hampshire Wildcats as a defensive tackle. Smith played very minimally in his freshman season, playing in only six games and recording eight tackles. In his sophomore season, Smith played in all thirteen games for New Hampshire and recorded 38 tackles, four sacks, and a blocked kick. During his sophomore year, Smith earned the 2010-11 CAA Commissioner's Academic Award. Smith posted similar stats in his junior season, posting 43 tackles, 2.5 sacks, and blocking another kick while playing in all 12 of the Wildcats' games.

Before Smith's senior season, he was placed on the inaugural Senior Bowl watch list. During the season, Smith recorded 26 solo tackles with 14 assists while recording 4 sacks. After the season, Smith was announced as a member of the All-New England Team and the All-CAA First-team. Smith was also invited to play in the 2013 Texas vs. Nation All-Star Game, a game in which he recorded 2 sacks.

Professional career

Seattle Seahawks
On April 27, 2013, the Seattle Seahawks selected Smith with the 241st pick in the 2013 NFL Draft. Despite playing his entire college career on the defensive line, the Seahawks drafted Smith with the intent of using him on the offensive line. Jared Smith was added to the Seahawks active roster on September 12, 2013. On October 8, Smith was placed on season-ending IR. Despite spending the majority of the season on IR, Smith became a Super Bowl champion when the Seahawks beat the Denver Broncos 43–8 in Super Bowl XLVIII for their first Super Bowl in franchise history.

Smith was released with an injury settlement by the Seahawks on March 24, 2015. He was later picked up by the Atlanta Falcons.

Atlanta Falcons
Smith was signed to the practice squad by the Atlanta Falcons on March 18, 2015.

Dallas Cowboys
Smith was signed by the Dallas Cowboys. On August 23, 2016, Smith was waived/injured. After clearing waivers, Smith was placed on injured reserve.

Smith reached an undisclosed injury settlement with the Cowboys on September 5, 2016. Smith was subsequently removed from the team's injured reserve list.

Personal life
Smith lives in Texas and is a practicing as real estate agent.

References

External links
Atlanta Falcons bio
New Hampshire Wildcats bio

1990 births
Living people
American football offensive guards
Atlanta Falcons players
New Hampshire Wildcats football players
Players of American football from Pittsburgh
Seattle Seahawks players
Dallas Cowboys players